Heidi N. Becker is an American planetary scientist who studies Jupiter as radiation monitoring investigation lead for NASA Juno space mission. She works at NASA's Jet Propulsion Laboratory.

Becker came to science late; she was a dance and theater student at the Los Angeles County High School for the Arts and the New York University Tisch School of the Arts, and graduated from NYU with a bachelor of fine arts in 1990. After working in theater in New York, she became interested in science through hospital volunteer work, and returned to college in her mid-20s, initially in New York and then transferring to California State Polytechnic University, Pomona. She joined the Jet Propulsion Lab while still working towards a second bachelor's degree in physics at Cal Poly Pomona. She completed her degree in 2001, and became a full-time researcher at JPL.

Becker's research on Jupiter has involved taking close-up images of Jupiter's moon Ganymede, discovering lightning unexpectedly high in Jupiter's atmosphere, finding a possible explanation for the lightning through antifreeze-like interactions between water and ammonia, and studying ammonia-water hailstorms as a mechanism for ammonia depletion from the upper atmosphere.

References

External links
Women in STEM Wednesday: Heidi Becker, dancer and NASA physicist, The Space Gal, August 26, 2015

Year of birth missing (living people)
Living people
American astronomers
American women astronomers
Planetary scientists
Women planetary scientists
Tisch School of the Arts alumni
California State Polytechnic University, Pomona alumni
Jet Propulsion Laboratory
Juno (spacecraft)